100 najboljih domaćih pesama (Top 100 Domestic Songs) was a list compiled by the Serbian Radio B92. In 2006, Radio B92 organized the poll for the selection of top 100 Yugoslav songs. The whole list was presented on radio B92 on November 5, 2006. The list contains popular music songs from former Yugoslavia and the songs from successor states.

The list

Reactions 
 
Darko Rundek, the former frontman of Haustor stated:

Toma Grujić, the editor-in-chief of Radio B92 stated:

Ivan Fece "Firchie", the former drummer of Ekatarina Velika stated:

See also 
YU 100: najbolji albumi jugoslovenske rok i pop muzike
Kako (ni)je propao rokenrol u Srbiji
Rock Express Top 100 Yugoslav Rock Songs of All Times

References 

 The list at B92 official site

Lists of rated songs
Serbian songs
Serbian rock music
Yugoslav rock music